Crespina is a frazione (hamlet) in the comune of Crespina Lorenzana, in the Province of Pisa in the Italian region Tuscany.

Crespina hosts the municipal seat of the comune.

References

External links

 Official website

Cities and towns in Tuscany
Frazioni of the Province of Pisa